{{DISPLAYTITLE:C6H4Cl2}}
The molecular formula C6H4Cl2 (molar mass: 147.00 g/mol) may refer to:

 1,2-Dichlorobenzene 
 1,3-Dichlorobenzene
 1,4-Dichlorobenzene
 Dichlorofulvenes
 1,6-Dichloro-2,4-hexadiyne